George Fleming Davis (March 23, 1911 – January 6, 1945) was a United States Navy officer and a recipient of America's highest military decoration, the Medal of Honor, for actions during World War II.

Early life
George F. Davis was born in Manila on March 23, 1911.

Navy career
Davis was appointed to the United States Naval Academy from the Naval Reserve in 1930 and graduated in May 1934. Ensign Davis' first duty station was the new heavy cruiser . While in that ship he served as an aircraft gunnery observer with her embarked aviation units. From 1939 to 1941 Lieutenant (Junior Grade) Davis served as an officer of the destroyer  and fast minesweeper .

Outbreak of World War II
Following promotion to the rank of lieutenant in mid-1941 he was assigned to the battleship , which was sunk on December 7, 1941, when Japan's surprise attack on Pearl Harbor opened the Pacific War.

In January 1942, Lieutenant Davis was transferred to the light cruiser , in which he participated in operations in the Aleutian Islands, the hard fighting over Guadalcanal and the Central Solomons, and the campaign to recover Guam. He was promoted to lieutenant commander and commander while serving in Honolulu, which he left in mid-1944. Following training in advanced surface warfare techniques, he was given command of the destroyer  in late November 1944. On 6 January 1945 his ship was covering minesweeping operations in advance of the Lingayen Gulf invasion when she was attacked by four Japanese Kamikazes. Though Walke shot down two, the third plane struck the ship, enveloping her bridge area in burning gasoline. Though horribly burned, Commander Davis remained on his feet, conned the ship, directed damage control efforts and saw to the destruction of the fourth suicide plane. Only when Walke's survival was assured did he relinquish his post to be taken below, where he died a short time later.

For his conduct, Commander Davis was posthumously awarded the Medal of Honor. His body was buried at sea.

Awards and honors
His awards include:

Medal of Honor citation
Commander George F. Davis' official Medal of Honor citation is as follows:

Legacy
The destroyer , 1957–1994, was named in his honor.

See also

List of Medal of Honor recipients
List of Medal of Honor recipients for World War II

References

1911 births
1945 deaths
United States Navy personnel killed in World War II
People who died at sea
Burials at sea
Foreign-born Medal of Honor recipients
United States Navy Medal of Honor recipients
World War II recipients of the Medal of Honor
Recipients of the Silver Star
Recipients of the Legion of Merit
People from Manila
United States Navy officers
American expatriates in the Philippines